The Portugal national under-20 rugby union team is Portugal's national junior team.

Portugal made their first Under 20 Trophy appearance at the 2013 IRB Junior World Rugby Trophy in Chile. They finished in 6th place after losing to Tonga 7 - 27 in the 5th place play-off.

In 2015 Portugal hosted the 2015 World Rugby Under 20 Trophy in Lisbon from 12-24 May.

Under 20 Trophy

2013 Under 20 Trophy
Pool A
 6 - 18 
 26 - 17 
 13 - 61 
5th Place Play-off
 7 - 27

References

External links
Official site

R
European national under-20 rugby union teams